The Miniaturist of Junagadh is a 2022 short film directed by Kaushal Oza that depicts the final moments of retired miniaturist Husyn Naqqash, played by Naseeruddin Shah, and his family. The plot of the film charts the family's final day in their ancestral home in the princely state of Junagadh.

Cast 

 Naseeruddin Shah as Husyn Naqqash
 Rasika Dugal as Nurhayat, Husyn's daughter
 Raj Arjun as Kishorilal Randeria
 Padmavati Rao as Sakina, Husyn's wife
 Uday Chandra as Tangewala

References 

2022 short films
Indian short films
2020s Hindi-language films